The 2017–18 season was Paksi SE's 12th competitive season, 12th consecutive season in the OTP Bank Liga and 65nd year in existence as a football club.

First team squad

Transfers

Summer

In:

Out:

Statistics

Appearances and goals
Last updated on 9 December 2017.

|-
|colspan="14"|Youth players:

|}

Top scorers
Includes all competitive matches. The list is sorted by shirt number when total goals are equal.

Last updated on 9 December 2017

Disciplinary record
Includes all competitive matches. Players with 1 card or more included only.

Last updated on 9 December 2017

Overall
{|class="wikitable"
|-
|Games played || 22 (19 OTP Bank Liga and 3 Hungarian Cup)
|-
|Games won || 9 (6 OTP Bank Liga and 3 Hungarian Cup)
|-
|Games drawn || 6 (6 OTP Bank Liga and 0 Hungarian Cup)
|-
|Games lost || 7 (7 OTP Bank Liga and 0 Hungarian Cup)
|-
|Goals scored || 38
|-
|Goals conceded || 30
|-
|Goal difference || +8
|-
|Yellow cards || 38
|-
|Red cards || 2
|-
|rowspan="1"|Worst discipline ||  Ádám Simon (7 , 0 )
|-
|rowspan="1"|Best result || 7–0 (A) v Balatonfüred - Magyar Kupa - 25-10-2017
|-
|rowspan="1"|Worst result || 1–4 (H) v Videoton - OTP Bank Liga - 06-09-2017
|-
|rowspan="1"|Most appearances ||  Lajos Bertus (21 appearances)
|-
|rowspan="1"|Top scorer ||  László Bartha (6 goals)
|-
|Points || 33/66 (50.0%)
|-

Nemzeti Bajnokság I

Matches

League table

Results summary

Results by round

Hungarian Cup

References

External links
 Official Website
 UEFA
 worldfootball

Paksi SE seasons
Hungarian football clubs 2017–18 season